Proberta is a census-designated place in Tehama County, California, United States. Proberta has a post office with ZIP code 96078. The population was 267 at the 2010 census.

History
Proberta was laid out in 1886 by Edward Proberta, and named for him. A post office has been in operation at Proberta since 1888.

Geography
According to the United States Census Bureau, the CDP covers an area of 1.4 square miles (3.7 km), all of it land.

Climate
According to the Köppen Climate Classification system, Proberta has a warm-summer Mediterranean climate, abbreviated "Csa" on climate maps.

Demographics
The 2010 United States Census reported that Proberta had a population of 267. The racial makeup of Proberta was 174 (65.2%) White, 0 (0.0%) African American, 7 (2.6%) Native American, 1 (0.4%) Asian, 1 (0.4%) Pacific Islander, 76 (28.5%) from other races, and 8 (3.0%) from two or more races. Hispanic or Latino of any race were 91 persons (34.1%).

The Census reported that 267 people (100% of the population) lived in households, 0 (0%) lived in non-institutionalized group quarters, and 0 (0%) were institutionalized.

There were 90 households, out of which 35 (38.9%) had children under the age of 18 living in them, 49 (54.4%) were opposite-sex married couples living together, 8 (8.9%) had a female householder with no husband present, 8 (8.9%) had a male householder with no wife present.  There were 7 (7.8%) unmarried opposite-sex partnerships, and 0 (0%) same-sex married couples or partnerships. 19 households (21.1%) were made up of individuals, and 8 (8.9%) had someone living alone who was 65 years of age or older. The average household size was 2.97.  There were 65 families (72.2% of all households); the average family size was 3.45.

The population was spread out, with 75 people (28.1%) under the age of 18, 31 people (11.6%) aged 18 to 24, 53 people (19.9%) aged 25 to 44, 72 people (27.0%) aged 45 to 64, and 36 people (13.5%) who were 65 years of age or older.  The median age was 33.1 years. For every 100 females, there were 103.8 males.  For every 100 females age 18 and over, there were 108.7 males.

The homeowner vacancy rate was 3.2%; the rental vacancy rate was 11.8%.  163 people (61.0% of the population) lived in owner-occupied housing units and 104 people (39.0%) lived in rental housing units.

References

Census-designated places in Tehama County, California
Census-designated places in California